Ahmed Habib Ki Betiyan() is a daily Pakistani soap opera broadcast by Hum TV. It is directed by Nadeem Sidiique and written by Sheema Kamal. Shabbir Jan, Sajal Aly, Anum Fayyaz and Kiran Haq portrayed the some of the main characters.

The show was also broadcast by Hum Sitaray in 2016 while in 2019 it aired in UK on Hum Europe.

Cast 
 Shabbir Jan as Ahmed Habib
 Annam Fayyaz
 Farah Nadeem
 Sajal Aly as Ayeza
 Yasir Shoro
 Kiran Haq
 Nisa Khan as Ayesha
 Farah Nadir
 Tipu Sharif as Faisal
Qaiser Naqvi
 Anita Fatima Camphor
 Khalid Anum

See also 
 List of programs broadcast by Hum TV

References 

Hum TV original programming
Pakistani drama television series
Urdu-language television shows
2011 Pakistani television series debuts